Abdominal guarding is the tensing of the abdominal wall muscles to guard inflamed organs within the abdomen from the pain of pressure upon them. The tensing is detected when the abdominal wall is pressed. Abdominal guarding is also known as défense musculaire.

Guarding is a characteristic finding in the physical examination for an abruptly painful abdomen (an acute abdomen) with inflammation of the inner abdominal (peritoneal) surface due, for example, to appendicitis or diverticulitis. The tensed muscles of the abdominal wall automatically go into spasm to keep the tender underlying tissues from being disturbed.

Diagnosis

Differential diagnosis 
 Abdominal aortic aneurysm
 Appendicitis
 Blunt force trauma to the abdomen
 Bowel obstruction
 Diverticulitis
 Dyspepsia
 Ectopic pregnancy
 GERD
 Ileus
 Inflammatory bowel disease
 Intussusception
 Mesenteric ischemia
 Nephrolithiasis
 Ovarian cyst
 Pancreatitis
 Pelvic inflammatory disease
 Perforated peptic ulcer disease
 Pneumonia
 Spontaneous bacterial peritonitis (SBP)
 Urinary tract infection/pyelonephritis
 Volvulus
 Zoster
 Skin lesions may not be visible until another day or two
 Abdominal migraine
 Abdominal wall strain/injury
 Abscess (e.g. iliopsoas)
 Hepatic or splenic contusion/laceration
 Incarcerated hernia
 Insect toxins (e.g. black widow spider)
 Malingering
 Pneumoperitoneum secondary to abdominal trauma
 Septic miscarriage (See Miscarriage)

Laboratory findings 
 Complete blood count (CBC)
 Blood urea nitrogen (BUN)/creatinine
 Liver function tests (LFTs)
 Glucose
 Amylase/lipase
 Urine culture
 Urinalysis
 Beta-human chorionic gonadotropin (beta-hCG)
 Cervical cultures are recommended to diagnose pelvic inflammatory disease

Electrolyte and biomarker studies 
 Electrolytes

MRI and CT 
 CT diagnoses:
 Organ contusion
 Organ laceration
 Aneurysm
 Diverticulitis
 Appendicitis

Echocardiography or ultrasound 
 Pelvic, abdominal and/or transvaginal ultrasound diagnoses:
 Peritonitis
 Ectopic pregnancy
 Ovarian cysts
 Fluid/blood secondary to trauma
 Appendicitis
 Aneurysm

Other imaging findings 
 KUB x-ray imaging (kidney, ureter, bladder) could reveal nephrolithiasis and bowel gas pattern

Other diagnostic studies 
 Symptomatic relief may be provided by paracentesis, which may also diagnose spontaneous bacterial peritonitis (SBP)
 Gastrointestinal endoscopy may be used or patients with suspected peptic ulcer disease
 Helicobacter pylori testing may also be used
 Trial medications may be beneficial for the diagnosis and treatment of:
 GERD/dyspepsia: Proton pump inhibitors or H2 blockers
 Abdominal wall strain: Nonsteriodal anti-inflammatory drugs (NSAIDs)
 Anxiety: Lorazepam
 Zoster: Acyclovir

Treatment 
 Specific conditions need direct treatment
 Hemodynamic status and life-threatening disease require immediate attention
 Volume replacement with a possible blood transfusion, and with normal saline
 For obstruction and persistent vomiting, place nasogastric (NG) tube

Pharmacotherapy 

 If perforated viscus or intra-abdominal infection suspected, administer broad-spectrum empiric antibiotics

Surgery and device-based therapy 
 Early sepsis, or evidence of hemorrhage may require surgery (likely to be life-threatening emergency)

References 
Kahan, Scott, Smith, Ellen G. In A Page: Signs and Symptoms. Malden, Massachusetts: Blackwell Publishing, 2004:3

Symptoms and signs: Digestive system and abdomen